{{DISPLAYTITLE:C25H22ClNO3}}
The molecular formula C25H22ClNO3 (molar mass: 419.90 g/mol, exact mass: 419.1288 u) may refer to:

 Esfenvalerate
 Fenvalerate

Molecular formulas